Nonthaburi Bridge, also commonly known as Nuanchawee Bridge, is a truss bridge spanning the Chao Phraya River between the Nonthaburi and Pathum Thani Provinces in Thailand. Opened in 1959, it carries national highway route 307, and is among the earliest bridges to cross the Chao Phraya. The bridge became known by the name Nuanchawee due to it being a location in the murder of Nualchawee Petchrung, a sensational crime in 1959.

Today the bridge remains an important link between Pathum Thani town and Bangkok's main eastern bank. Plans were made to raise the bridge, but were later scrapped due to the potential adverse effects on traffic.

References

Bridges in Thailand
Bridges completed in 1959
Crossings of the Chao Phraya River